Mari (also Romanized as Mārī; also known as Maru and Sārī) is a village in Qareh Poshtelu-e Bala Rural District, Qareh Poshtelu District, Zanjan County, Zanjan Province, Iran. At the 2006 census, its population was 287, in 60 families.

References 

Populated places in Zanjan County